No. 230 Squadron is an RAF squadron, currently based at RAF Benson.
The squadron was part of Royal Air Force Germany, operating the Puma HC.1 there from 1980. Following the drawdown at the end of the Cold War, the squadron disbanded on 30 April 1992. This was short-lived however and the squadron reformed at RAF Aldergrove on 4 May 1992, again with the Puma HC.1.

The squadron is well experienced in night flying; almost a third of flights are undertaken after dark.
The 2004 Future Capabilities chapter of the UK Defence White Paper, Delivering Security in a Changing World announced a plan to reduce the squadrons Puma force by 6 helicopters. It was announced in late 2008 that the squadron was to move to RAF Benson by 2010. The Squadron re-equipped with Puma HC Mk2 in 2014 following removal from service of the Puma HC Mk1.

History

First formation
No. 230 Squadron was formed on 20 August 1918 at Felixstowe, consisting of three Flights. No.327 and 328 Flight used Felixstowe F.2 and F.2A flying boats and Fairey IIIs for maritime reconnaissance, whilst No.487 Flight flew Sopwith Camels on escort duties. At the end of World War I the squadron was retained as one of the few RAF coastal units. In 1920 the squadron got Felixstowe F.5 flying boats, and it moved to RAF Calshot in May 1922, where on 1 April 1923 it was renumbered to 480 Flight RAF.

First reformation
On 1 December 1934 No. 230 Squadron was reformed at RAF Pembroke Dock with Short Singapore flying boats. The Squadron used the Singapore till 1938, serving from Aboukir, Alexandria, Lake Timsah and after a short return to the UK, RAF Seletar. On 22 June 1938 the first Short Sunderland flying boat arrived, the aircraft the Squadron would be equipped with for the next 20 years, in fact until 28 February 1957 when the Squadron was disbanded at Pembroke Dock.

Second reformation
On 1 September 1958 No. 215 Squadron RAF at Dishforth was renumbered 230 Squadron, flying Scottish Aviation Pioneer light transport aircraft in support of the Army. In November that year, the squadron moved to RAF Nicosia in Cyprus as a response to the Cyprus Emergency, flying reconnaissance operations against EOKA Greek Cypriot nationalist guerrillas as well as its normal communications duties. The squadron returned to Britain in April 1959, with its new base being RAF Upavon. In 1960, the squadron supplemented its Pioneers with larger Scottish Aviation Twin Pioneer aircraft, and in May that year the squadron moved to RAF Odiham. In September 1960, the squadron's 'A' Flight was detached to British Cameroon, flying internal security patrols as the colony prepared for the 1961 British Cameroons referendum. The flight returned to its parent formation in September 1961. Westland Whirlwind HAR.10 helicopters began to arrive in June 1962, becoming the squadron's standard equipment by the end of the year.

In January 1963 No.230 Squadron moved to RAF Gütersloh, West Germany, with a detachment at Nicosia. The squadron returned to Odiham in December 1964 before being transferred to Borneo, due to the Indonesia–Malaysia confrontation in February 1965. In October 1966 the squadron again returned to Odiham, resuming its detachment at Nicosia. In November 1971 began to convert to the Westland Puma HC.1 at RAF Odiham. On 14 October 1980, the squadron moved back to RAF Gütersloh, West Germany where they remained until being disbanded and reformed at RAF Aldergrove, Northern Ireland in April 1992.

230 sqn was one of two Northern Ireland based squadrons of the Royal Air Force, the other being 72 Squadron (equipped with Westland Wessex HC2s). 230 Squadron's 18 Puma aircraft were rotated with No. 33 Squadron's 15 Pumas to even out flight hours amongst the fleet (Northern Ireland based helicopters had a much higher operational tempo). The main role of the squadron was tactical transport of the Security Forces, including the Royal Ulster Constabulary (RUC), Police Service of Northern Ireland and the British Army.

On 17 November 2009, 230 Squadron eventually left Northern Ireland for RAF Benson in Oxfordshire (together with 33 Squadron from RAF Odiham) after 17 years in the province.

Kabul accident

On 11 October 2015, one member of the squadron was killed in an accident in Kabul, Afghanistan, whilst landing at the NATO Training and Support Mission HQ. A Ministry of Defence spokesman said the crash was "an accident and not the result of insurgent activity". The crewman was named a day later, and was repatriated back to the UK on the 20th. The Flight Lieutenant's CO commented saying "A man with exceptionally high standards, he was never afraid to remind anyone when he felt they could have done better. However, this advice was always delivered with his characteristic wry smile and good humour. The Support Helicopter Force has lost not only an outstanding operator but a good friend to so many...his lasting legacy will be the professionalism and courage he passed onto all who flew with him. A loving husband and father, our thoughts are with his wife and children at this most difficult of times." A post mortem found he died of severe head injuries. The inquest was adjourned indefinitely until the conclusion of separate inquiries being undertaken by the Ministry of Defence were completed.

The squadron was awarded a new squadron standard in February 2019 by RAF Benson's Honorary Air Marshal, Prince Michael of Kent. The standard, the third to be awarded to the squadron, is made of silk and features the battle honours awarded to the unit since its formation.

Aircraft operated

Squadron bases

See also
 List of RAF squadrons

References
Notes

Bibliography

 Bowyer, Michael J.F. and John D.R. Rawlings. Squadron Codes 1937–56. Cambridge, UK: Patrick Stephens Ltd., 1979. .
 Deller, Alan W. The Kid Glove Pilot: A Personal Account of Flying Sunderlands in World War Two. Newtownards, County Down, Northern Ireland: Colourpoint Books, 2004. .
 Docherty, Tom. Hunt Like a Tiger: 230 Squadron at War, 1939–45. Bognor Regis, West Sussex, UK: Woodfield Publishing, 2003. .
 Flintham, Vic and Andrew Thomas. Combat Codes: A Full Explanation and Listing of British, Commonwealth and Allied Air Force Unit Codes since 1938. Shrewsbury, Shropshire, UK: Airlife Publishing Ltd., 2003. .
 Halley, James J. The Squadrons of the Royal Air Force. Tonbridge, Kent, UK: Air Britain (Historians) Ltd., 1980. .
 Halley, James J. The Squadrons of the Royal Air Force & Commonwealth, 1918–1988. Tonbridge, Kent, UK: Air Britain (Historians) Ltd., 1988. .
 Jefford, C.G. RAF Squadrons, a Comprehensive Record of the Movement and Equipment of all RAF Squadrons and their Antecedents since 1912. Shrewsbury: Airlife Publishing, 2001. .
 "Operation Tiger 9". Air International, January 2010, Vol. 78, No. 1. p. 7.
 Rawlings, J.D.R. "History of 230 Squadron". Air Pictorial, July 1969. Vol. 31 No.7. pp. 242–244.
 Rawlings, John D.R. Coastal, Support and Special Squadrons of the RAF and their Aircraft. London: Jane's Publishing Company Ltd., 1982. .
 Warner, Guy. No. 230 Squadron Royal Air Force "Kita chari jauh – We search far". Newtownards, County Down, Northern Ireland: Colourpoint Books, 2004. .

External links

 230 Squadron
 History of No.'s 226–230 Squadrons at RAF Web
 230 "Tiger" Squadron Air Training Corps
 230 Squadron at Helicopter History site

230 Squadron
Military units and formations established in 1918
Aircraft squadrons of the Royal Air Force in World War II
1918 establishments in the United Kingdom